Narjot de Toucy is the name of:

 Narjot I of Toucy, who became Lord of Toucy in 1100
 Narjot II of Toucy (died 1192), grandson of the preceding
 Narjot de Toucy (died 1241), Regent of Constantinople, second son of the preceding
 Narjot de Toucy (died 1293), Admiral of Sicily, grandson of the preceding